Ban Kalan station is a railway station located in Na Rung Subdistrict, Sikhoraphum District, Surin Province.

References 

Railway stations in Thailand
Surin province